The Diocese of Eldoret may refer to;

Anglican Diocese of Eldoret, in the city of Eldoret, Kenya
Roman Catholic Diocese of Eldoret, in the city of Eldoret, Kenya